Ialysos (before 1976: Τριάντα Trianta) is a town and a former municipality on the island of Rhodes, in the Dodecanese, Greece. Since the 2011 local government reform it is part of the municipality Rhodes, of which it is a municipal unit. The municipal unit has an area of 16.7 km2. It is the second-largest town on the island of Rhodes. It has a population of approximately 11,300, and is located eight kilometres west of the town of Rhodes, the island's capital, on the island's northwestern coast.

Overview

The town is situated near the site of the ancient Doric polis of Ialysus, homeland of the famous ancient boxer Diagoras of Rhodes. The municipal unit consists of the town Trianta/Ialysos and the surrounding areas. While official sources use Trianta as a name for the town, and Ialysos for the whole municipal unit, unofficial usage tend to favour Ialysos to describe both the modern town and the municipal unit. 

Until the mid-1980s Trianta/Ialysos was a village with a population of around 2500 people, but during the following years population grew to an official 10,107 at the 2001 census, as it to an increasing degree became a suburban district to the town of Rhodes. Ialysos has in addition become a tourist destination, with several hotels and resorts located on the coast, especially in the new settlement of Ixia, situated between the towns of Ialysos and Rhodes. Being on the usually windward north-western coast of the island, it is also a noted location for wind-surfing.

Education
State facilities by category:
 Primary Education: 3 primary schools
 Secondary Education: 1 high school and 1 lyceum

Sports

Football
Town football team GAS Ialysos currently competes at national level third tier (Gamma Ethniki) while in the 90s team competed even at Beta Ethniki (now Football League) losing promotion to Greece's top league during 1994-95 season.

Basketball
GAS Ialysos currently competes on local league but in the past reached national league C.

Sports venues
Town municipal "Ekonomideio" stadium hosts football and Ialysos indoor hall basketball.

Notable people
Timocreon (5th century BC) poet
Diagoras of Rhodes (5th century BC) boxer

See also
Ialysos (mythology)

References

External links

Official website 
Temple of Athena Polias at Ialysus
Museum of mineralogy & paleontology Stamatiadis

Populated places in Rhodes